Platylesches is a genus of skipper butterflies in the family Hesperiidae, commonly called hoppers, found in Africa.

Species
Listed alphabetically:
Platylesches affinissima Strand, 1920
Platylesches ayresii (Trimen, 1889) – peppered hopper
Platylesches batangae (Holland, 1894)
Platylesches chamaeleon (Mabille, 1891)
Platylesches dolomitica Henning & Henning, 1997 – hilltop hopper, dolomite hopper
Platylesches fosta Evans, 1937
Platylesches galesa (Hewitson, 1877) – white-tail hopper, black hopper
Platylesches hassani Collins & Larsen, 2008
Platylesches heathi Collins & Larsen, 2008
Platylesches iva Evans, 1937
Platylesches lamba Neave, 1910
Platylesches langa Evans, 1937
Platylesches larseni Kielland, 1992
Platylesches moritili (Wallengren, 1857) – common hopper, honey hopper
Platylesches neba (Hewitson, 1877) – flower-girl hopper
Platylesches panga Evans, 1937
Platylesches picanini (Holland, 1894) – banded hopper
Platylesches rasta Evans, 1937
Platylesches robustus Neave, 1910 – robust hopper
Platylesches rossii Belcastro, 1986
Platylesches shona Evans, 1937
Platylesches tina Evans, 1937 – small hopper

References
Natural History Museum Lepidoptera genus database
Seitz, A. Die Gross-Schmetterlinge der Erde 13: Die Afrikanischen Tagfalter. Plate XIII 79 c

Erionotini
Hesperiidae genera